Stepover or step over may refer to:

 Fault stepover, term from strike-slip tectonics
 Stepover toehold, wrestling hold
 Stepover, an espalier design in horticulture
 Step over, football dribbling move

See also
 
 
 Stepove (disambiguation)
 Stopover (disambiguation)